Medullary ray may refer to:

 Medullary ray (anatomy), the middle part of the Cortical lobule
 Medullary ray (botany), characteristic radial sheets or ribbons extending vertically, found in woods